DLH is a three-letter abbreviation which may refer to:

 Abbreviation for pre-war Deutsche Luft Hansa
 DLH Group, a Danish timber supply company
 Domestic long-haired cat
 IATA code for Duluth International Airport in Duluth, Minnesota
 Former abbreviation of General Directorate of the Infrastructural Investment in Turkey
 ICAO designator for Lufthansa, a German airline
 Station code of the Amtrak Thruway Motorcoach station in Duluth, Minnesota